Justin Torres (born 1980) is an American novelist and an Assistant Professor of English at University of California, Los Angeles. He won the First Novelist Award for his semi-autobiographical novel We the Animals which was also a Publishing Triangle Award finalist and a NAACP Image Award nominee. We the Animals has been adapted into a film and awarded the Next Innovator Prize at the Sundance Film Festival.

Early life 
Justin Torres was born to a father of Puerto Rican descent and a mother of Italian and Irish descent. He was raised in Baldwinsville, New York as the youngest of three brothers. Although his novel We the Animals is not an autobiography, Torres has said that the "hard facts" in the novel mirror his own life. City of God by Gil Cuadros, published in 1994, reportedly helped him to come out as gay. After leaving his family home, he attended New York University on scholarship but quickly dropped out. After a few years of moving around in the country and taking whatever job came, a friend invited him to sit in a writing course taught at The New School which motivated him to start writing seriously.

Awards and honors
His first novel, We the Animals (Houghton Mifflin Harcourt, 2011), won an Indies Choice Book Awards (Adult Debut Honor Award) and was also a Publishing Triangle Award finalist and a NAACP Image Award nominee (Outstanding Literary Work, Debut Author). Torres further won the 2012 First Novelist Award for We the Animals. 
Torres was named by Salon.com as one of the sexiest men of 2011.
In 2012 the National Book Foundation named him among their  5 under 35 young fiction writers.

Career
In 2010, Torres received his master's degree from Iowa Writers' Workshop. He was a 2010-2012 Stegner Fellow at Stanford University.
He was a recipient of the Rolón Fellowship in Literature from United States Artists. In the summer of 2016, Torres was the Picador Guest Professor for Literature at the University of Leipzig's Institute for American Studies in Leipzig, Germany. He was a former dog walker and a former employee of McNally Jackson, a bookstore in Manhattan. Torres is currently an Assistant Professor of English at University of California, Los Angeles.

He has published short fiction for The New Yorker, Granta, Harper's, Tin House, Glimmer Train, The Washington Post, and other publications, as well as non-fiction for The Advocate and The Guardian.

A movie version of We The Animals, directed by Jeremiah Zagar, premiered at the Sundance Film Festival in 2018, where it won the Next Innovator Prize.

References

External links

Los Angeles Review of Books - Daniel Olivas interviews Justin Torres
Brooklyn Rail - In Conversation Justin Torres and Jenine Holmes

1980 births
Living people
21st-century American novelists
21st-century American male writers
American male novelists
Puerto Rican male writers
Puerto Rican novelists
The New Yorker people
Stegner Fellows
Gay men